El Reencuentro was the name that six ex-members of musical group Menudo used for their comeback project remembering Menudo's golden era. Ricky Melendez, Rene Farrait, Miguel Cancel, Johnny Lozada, Ray Reyes, and Charlie Masso re-joined to celebrate the 15th anniversary of their success in Latin America, North America, Spain and several other countries in the world.  They started in 1998 as an experimental project and they had an unexpected success that continued until 2015 through North and Latin America.

History

1998
In the late 90's, former members of Menudo reunited for a radio special in Sistema 102 a local Puerto Rican radio station. Hundreds of fans gathered outside the radio station that night and the idea kicked off for a one time concert to be held at the Centro de Bellas Artes in Santurce.

Ray Reyes was the member that took the idea to the next level, and began contacting members Ricky Meléndez, Johnny Lozada, René Farrait, Miguel Cancel, Charlie Massó and Xavier Serbiá, with Xavier being the only member to decline participating in the event. Despite the idea of having a concert at Centro de Bellas Artes, response was so big that the band had to move the concert to Coliseo Roberto Clemente and tickets went sold out in less than an hour so it ended up being three consecutive concerts in San Juan and tour around America.

The band got a million-dollar record contract with Fonovisa Records that distributed their gold-selling live album El Reencuentro: 15 Años Después.

2005-Present
After the 1998 concert, the band didn't reunite until 2005.  The band continued to reunite sporadically during the late 2000's. In 2010, they performed in Hato Rey, Puerto Rico.

Following the 2010 Haiti Earthquake, the group released a single titled "Amistad" to raise funds. This was the first and only time that the group released any original material. The track was written by Omar Alfanno and Roberto Sueiro with Miguel Cancel and Charlie Massó providing lead vocals. 

On August 25, 2015, El Reencuentro announced that they would no longer be performing as a group. Already slated shows had to be canceled and Lozada apologized to fans saying the issue had been over the timing of payment for the band's performances.

During 2015, four of the members of El Reencuentro went back on tour, this time under the name 'Menudomania Forever'. These included Masso, Farrait, Reyes and Cancel. They were joined by 13 other Menudo from different eras, including Robert Avellanet, Jonathan Montenegro and Rawy Torres.

In 2019, Melendez, Lozada, Cancel, Reyes, and Farrait reconciled and began performing together once again under the name Menudo but without Masso due to disagreements between Lozada and Masso. In September 2019 their "Subete a Mi Moto Tour" began in their native Puerto Rico and spread internationally. 

Reyes died on April 30, 2021 of an apparent heart attack. He was 51.

Discography

Albums

Singles

References

External links
Listen to Menudo songs performed by El Reencuentro

1998 establishments in Puerto Rico
2015 disestablishments in Puerto Rico
Puerto Rican musical groups
Menudo (band)
Latin pop music groups
Musical groups established in 1998
Musical groups disestablished in 2015